Brandt Andersen (born September 13, 1977) is an American Activist, Film Director, Writer, and Producer. Andersen is known for such films as Everest, Lone Survivor,  2 Guns, Escape Plan, and Broken City. His film The Flowers of War was nominated for a Golden Globe Award in 2011.  Two of Andersen's films have premiered at the Sundance Film Festival.  First in 2012 with the Stephen Frears film Lay The Favorite,  and then in 2015 with the Jared Hess-directed Don Verdean.

Other projects include the Doug Liman film American Made starring Tom Cruise, the Martin Scorsese film Silence, starring Andrew Garfield and Liam Neeson, the Garry Marshall film Mother's Day, starring Jennifer Aniston, Julia Roberts, and Kate Hudson.

Andersen most recently wrote and directed a short film titled REFUGEE starring Yasmine Al Massri, Omar Sy, and Jason Beghe. The film was Andersen's directorial debut and has been screened at film festivals across the globe, by the UNHCR for World Refugee Day, and at Banksy's Walled Off Hotel. The film earned Andersen the award for Best Director and Best Dramatic Short Film at the 2020 French Riviera Film Festival and was notably short-listed for an Academy Award for Best Live Action Short in 2020.

Early career
Prior to working in film Andersen owned an NBA Development League franchise. During the 4 seasons (2006–2012) the team played they made the finals or playoffs every year.  During his ownership tenure, the team had the highest attendance and sponsorship revenue in the NBA Development League.  Andersen hosted the Iranian National Basketball team as they trained for the 2008 Olympics.  For his assistance in helping the Iranian Olympic Team, Andersen, along with then Deputy Commissioner of the NBA Adam Silver, received a medal of peace from the Iranian Basketball Association.  In 2009 the Chinese National Basketball Team awarded Andersen an award for the cooperation shown in allowing their National team access to train with the Utah Flash.  Andersen was one of the first sports owners to put a strong emphasis on recycling in-arena waste.  For instituting the Flash Recycling Initiative, Andersen was awarded the Environmental Quality Award in Utah.   In 2013, Andersen sold the team to the Philadelphia 76ers.

In 2007 Andersen and famed architect Frank Gehry collaborated to design a community outside of Salt Lake City, Utah. Andersen has publicly stated that his friendship with Mr. Gehry has had a huge impact on how he works and views creativity.

In 1998, Andersen attended Brigham Young University.  During his sophomore year at BYU, while working at a small film studio to pay for his education, he founded uSight, a technology company that created banking and transactional software for small businesses. In 2004, Inc. reported that the company was the second fastest growing company on its annual Inc. 500 list. Shortly after Andersen sold and exited the company.  Andersen was the sole shareholder and the sale was reported above $50M. Following the sale he returned to school and graduated with a BA in Fine Arts from Brigham Young University.

Philanthropy
Andersen first started working with Refugees in 2009.  From 2009 to 2019 Andersen traveled to visit refugees in Turkey, Greece, Jordan, Italy, Germany, France, and Mexico. In July 2017, in association with CARE, Andersen led a group of filmmakers including Shay Mitchell, Jason Beghe, and Tobias Schliessler to the Azraq refugee camp in Jordan to run a filmmaking bootcamp for Syrian teenagers. Their film Peace Please has been shown at Human Rights conferences around the world.

In 2010, three days after the earthquake that devastated the country of Haiti, Andersen traveled with a team of Doctors to Port-au-Prince, Haiti.  He spent 10 days working with doctors and aid workers and assisted in importing and disseminating millions in aid.  Upon his return Andersen raised money to help rebuild an orphanage on the outskirts of Port-au-Prince.  While in Haiti USA Today listed Andersen's Twitter account as one of the top ten accounts to follow for updates from the country.

In 2006 Andersen started the Flash Family Foundation to help children living below the poverty line with food, clothing, and education.  The foundation was run by Andersen with the help of volunteers including basketball players from the Utah Flash and Utah Jazz.

While attending University, Andersen spent a year training with the Utah County Search and Rescue Team, part of the Utah County Sheriff's Department.  Following his training, Andersen spent the next five years as an on-call volunteer for the Search and Rescue team.  His work included assisted rescues and recovery in some of the most extreme environments in the Mountain West.  During his time with Search and Rescue he was trained and certified in avalanche rescue and recovery, water rescue, ice rescue, canyoneering, and mountain rescue techniques.

Filmography
 The Flowers of War (2011, China)
 Lone Survivor (2013)
 2 Guns (2013)
 Broken City (2013)
 Escape Plan (2014)
 Lone Survivor (2014)
 Everest (2015)
 Don Verdean (2015)
 Mother's Day (2016)
 Silence (2016)
 American Made (2017)

References

Brigham Young University alumni
American film producers
Living people
1977 births
Businesspeople from Tampa, Florida